Mylothris ochrea is a butterfly in the family Pieridae. It is found in the Democratic Republic of the Congo (southern Kivu). The habitat consists of forests and forest margins.

References

Butterflies described in 1981
Pierini
Endemic fauna of the Democratic Republic of the Congo
Butterflies of Africa